The 2015 East Devon District Council election took place on 7 May 2015 to elect members of East Devon District Council in England. This was on the same day as other local elections.

Ward Results

References 

2015 English local elections
May 2015 events in the United Kingdom
2015
2010s in Devon